William Sands may refer to:
 Sir William Sands, 1st Baronet (d. 1687), of the Sands baronets
 William Sands, senior (d. 1751), English architect
 William Sands, junior (–), English architect, son of the above
 William Sands (soldier) (1835–1918), American soldier
 William Sands (film editor) (1923–1984), American film editor
 William Franklin Sands (1874–1946), American diplomat
 Billy Sands (1911–1984), American actor

See also
 Sands (surname)
 William Sandys (disambiguation)
 William Sands Cox